Soldier Boy may refer to:
 Soldier Boy, the English title of an operetta by Emmerich Kálmán
 Soldier Boy, three comic book superheroes from The Boys and its television adaptation
 "Soldier Boy" (1915 song), a World War I era song
 Soldier Boy (film), a 2019 Russian film about World War II
 "Soldier Boy" (The Shirelles song), a 1962 number-one single by The Shirelles
 "Soldier Boy" (short story), a 1982 science fiction short story
 Soulja Boy (born 1990), American rapper
 George Curry (baseball) (1888–1963), American baseball player who went by the nickname "Soldier Boy"
 The Soldierboys, a 1967 New Zealand short film